Multinational Division Central-South (MND-CS), created in September 2003, and supported by NATO, was a part of the Multinational Force Iraq. Headquartered in Camp Echo, it was under Polish command until October 2008, when the last of Poland's troops were withdrawn.  The Polish contingent was its largest. Other participants included Armenia, Bosnia and Herzegovina, Bulgaria, Denmark, Kazakhstan, Latvia, Lithuania, Mongolia, Norway, Romania, El Salvador, Slovakia, Spain, Ukraine and the United States of America. As of December 2008, Armenian, Bosnian, Danish, Latvian, Kazakh, Lithuanian, Mongolian, Spanish and Slovakian forces had been fully withdrawn.

The South Central zone (formerly the Upper South zone, also known as the Polish zone covered the area south of Baghdad: Al-Qādisiyyah Governorate, Karbala Governorate, Babil Governorate and the Wasit Governorate, all of which have been transferred to the Iraqi government. The region has a population of about 5 million spread over 65 632 km². Major cities in the area include Diwaniyah, Kut, Hillah, and Karbala and Najaf.

The Najaf Governorate was passed back to American control in 2004, due to reduction in strength of the forces under Polish command; this reduced the zone to about 3 million of population spread over 28 655 km². On January 5, 2006, Polish troops handed over control of the central Babil province to U.S. troops.

General information

The strength of the Polish forces has decreased from 2224 (2003) to 900 (2007). The Ukrainian forces numbered 1640 in 2003, by mid-2005 the number decreased to 900, and about 29 officers and 8 Non-commissioned officers (NCOs) deployed, serving in headquarters and in a unit of military assistance, before the final withdrawal in 2008. Other contingents in 2003 numbered: 

 Spain, 1340; 
 Thailand, 886; 
 Bulgaria, 480; 
 Honduras, 364; 
 Philippines, 350; 
 El Salvador, 346; 
 Dominican Republic, 300; 
 Hungary, 300; 
 Romania, 220; 
 Mongolia, 190; 
 Latvia, 145; 
 Nicaragua, 111, 
 Slovak Republic, 111; 
 Lithuania, 45; 
 Kazakhstan, 25; 
 Denmark, 10; 
 Netherlands, 6; 
 Norway, 5; 
 some support and liaison personnel from United Kingdom and the United States Army.

The Division has been switching from stabilization tasks (patrols, etc.) towards training the Iraqi Army (8th Infantry Division and security forces – Iraqi Police and Iraqi Border Police).

The divisional headquarters was moved in 2004 from Camp Babilon to Camp Echo.

According to mission statement the primary task of the MND CS was to oversee the transfer of the military and security in the areas under its control to the provisional Iraqi authorities.

Description in State of Denial

In Bob Woodward's book State of Denial he recounts the experience of Frank Miller, who as of March 2004 was the senior director for defense on the National Security Council. During the course of a fact finding trip to Iraq in that month he visited the leadership of the Multinational Division. Woodward's description is as follows:

Miller moved on to meet with the Polish commander of the Multinational Division, made up of troops from 23 nations. This was the shakiest part of the coalition—but an important fig leaf to suggest that the war was a broad international effort

The Polish division commander told Miller, "I've got 23 separate national units. They have 23 separate rules of engagement. I pick up the phone, I tell the colonel in charge of the Spanish Brigade what to do. He picks up his phone, calls Madrid, and says, 'I've been told to do this. Is it okay?'"

Miller understood that this meant the Multinational Division had little or no fighting capability.

Commanders

Forces

Polish

Spanish and Latin America

Ukrainian

See also
Polish involvement in the 2003 invasion of Iraq
Multi-National Force – Iraq
United States Forces – Iraq

References

Multinational Division Central-South Official Page

External links
Multi-National Division – (Central South) at globalsecurity.org
Lieutenant Colonel Robert Strzelecki, Polish Army, Lessons Learned: Multinational Division Central-South
Multinational Division Central-South Commemorative Medal

Military units and formations established in 2003
Multinational force involved in the Iraq War